Murrieta Mesa High School (MMHS) is a comprehensive, four-year high school located in Murrieta, California, United States. It is operated by the Murrieta Valley Unified School District. The school opened in 2009 to keep up with population growth in Murrieta. The first graduating class was the class of 2012. The school derives its name from the mesa it sits on, identified in an 1884 surveyor's map of the valley.

Feeder schools
 Elementary: E. Hale Curran, Avaxat, Antelope Hills, Rail Ranch, Synclax
 Middle: Shivela Middle School

References

High schools in Riverside County, California
Public high schools in California
Murrieta, California
Educational institutions established in 2009
2009 establishments in California